Franz Joseph Xaver Karl Fürst zu Hohenlohe-Waldenburg-Schillingsfürst (27 November 1745, Waldenburg – 9 October 1819, Augsburg) was a Roman Catholic auxiliary bishop and bishop of Augsburg (the first after it ceased to be the Prince-Bishopric of Augsburg), as well as vicar general of Neu-Württemberg, later Diocese of Rottenburg.

Life
Descended from the Hohenlohe dynasty, he was the son of Prince Karl Albrecht I. zu Hohenlohe-Waldenburg-Schillingsfürst (22 September 1719 - 25 January 1793) and his first wife Sophie Wilhelmine zu Löwenstein-Wertheim-Rochefort (7 August 1720 - 29 September 1749). Educated by Jesuits, he studied in Parma and Strasbourg and was ordained priest in Cologne on 7 April 1787. He later served as dean of Ellwangen Abbey and a canon in Cologne, Vienna and Strasbourg. Under Prince Clemens Wenceslaus of Saxony, the last Prince-Bishop of Augsburg, Hohenlohe was appointed as an auxiliary bishop in the Augsburg diocese and titular bishop of Tempe, both on 9 August 1802, shortly before it was secularised. He was consecrated as a bishop of 5 September 1802 by Clemens in the Pfarrkirche in Marktoberdorf, with the assistance of the abbots of St. Mang's Abbey and Irsee Abbey.

When the prince-bishopric was secularised, it initially remained within its existing borders.

References

Bibliography
Frank Raberg: Biographisches Handbuch der württembergischen Landtagsabgeordneten 1815–1933. Im Auftrag der Kommission für geschichtliche Landeskunde in Baden-Württemberg. Kohlhammer Verlag, Stuttgart 2001, S. 388.
Friedrich Lauchert: Hohenlohe-Waldenburg, Franz Prinz zu. In: Allgemeine Deutsche Biographie (ADB). Band 50, Duncker & Humblot, Leipzig 1905, S. 441 f.
Franz Xaver von Funk: Die katholische Landesuniversität Ellwangen und ihre Verlegung nach Tübingen. In: Festgabe zum Fünfundzwanzigjährigen Regierungsjubiläum seiner Majestät des Königs Karl von Württemberg. In Ehrfurcht dargebracht von der Universität Tübingen. Laupp, Tübingen 1889, getrennte Zählung S. 1–30, hier S. 6–27 (Auch Sonderabdruck).
Ignaz von Longner: Beiträge zur Geschichte der oberrheinischen Kirchenprovinz. Laupp, Tübingen 1863, S. 362–394.
Stephan Jakob Neher (ed.): Statistischer Personal-Katalog des Bisthums Rottenburg. Festschrift zum 50-jährigen Jubiläum dieses Bisthums. Schmid, Schwäbisch Gmünd 1878, S. 7.

External links
Franz Karl Joseph Fürst von Hohenlohe-Waldenburg-Schillingsfürst on www.catholic-hierarchy.org

1745 births
1819 deaths
Roman Catholic bishops of Augsburg